In mathematics, especially in the area of algebra known as representation theory, the representation ring (or Green ring after J. A. Green) of a group is a ring formed from all the (isomorphism classes of the) finite-dimensional linear representations of the group. Elements of the representation ring are sometimes called virtual representations. For a given group, the ring will depend on the base field of the representations.  The case of complex coefficients is the most developed, but the case of algebraically closed fields of characteristic p where the Sylow p-subgroups are cyclic is also theoretically approachable.

Formal definition
Given a group G and a field F, the elements of its representation ring RF(G) are the formal differences of isomorphism classes of finite dimensional linear F-representations of G.  For the ring structure, addition is given by the direct sum of representations, and multiplication by their tensor product over F.  When F is omitted from the notation, as in R(G), then F is implicitly taken to be the field of complex numbers.

Succinctly, the representation ring of G is the Grothendieck ring of the category of finite-dimensional representations of G.

Examples
For the complex representations of the cyclic group of order n, the representation ring RC(Cn) is isomorphic to  Z[X]/(Xn − 1), where X corresponds to the complex representation sending a generator of the group to a primitive nth root of unity.
More generally, the complex representation ring of a finite abelian group may be identified with the group ring of the character group.
For the rational representations of the cyclic group of order 3, the representation ring RQ(C3) is isomorphic to Z[X]/(X2 − X − 2), where X corresponds to the irreducible rational representation of dimension 2.
For the modular representations of the cyclic group of order 3 over a field F of characteristic 3,  the representation ring RF(C3) is isomorphic to Z[X,Y]/(X2 − Y − 1, XY − 2Y,Y2 − 3Y).
The continuous representation ring R(S1) for the circle group is isomorphic to Z[X, X −1].   The ring of real representations is the subring of R(G) of elements fixed by the involution on R(G) given by X ↦ X −1.
The ring RC(S3) for the symmetric group on three points is isomorphic to Z[X,Y]/(XY − Y,X2 − 1,Y2 − X − Y − 1), where X is the 1-dimensional alternating representation and Y the 2-dimensional irreducible representation of S3.

Characters
Any representation defines a character χ:G → C. Such a function is constant on conjugacy classes of G, a so-called class function; denote the ring of class functions by C(G). If G is finite, the homomorphism R(G) → C(G) is injective, so that R(G) can be identified with a subring of C(G).  For fields F whose characteristic divides the order of the group G, the homomorphism from RF(G) → C(G) defined by Brauer characters is no longer injective.

For a compact connected group R(G) is isomorphic to the subring of R(T) (where T is a maximal torus) consisting of those class functions that are invariant under the action of the Weyl group (Atiyah and Hirzebruch, 1961). For the general compact Lie group, see Segal (1968).

λ-ring and Adams operations
Given a representation of G and a natural number n, we can form the n-th exterior power of the representation, which is again a representation of G. This induces an operation λn : R(G) → R(G). With these operations, R(G) becomes a λ-ring.

The Adams operations on the representation ring R(G) are maps Ψk characterised by their effect on characters χ:

The operations Ψk are ring homomorphisms of R(G) to itself, and on representations ρ of dimension d

where the Λiρ are the exterior powers of ρ and Nk is the k-th power sum expressed as a function of the d elementary symmetric functions of d variables.

References

.

.
 

Group theory
Ring theory
Finite groups
Lie groups
Representation theory of groups